The following people died by suicide. This includes suicides effected under duress and excludes deaths by accident or misadventure. People who may or may not have died by their own hand, or whose intention to die is in dispute, but who are widely believed to have deliberately killed themselves, may be listed under "possible suicides".

Confirmed suicides

A

 Chris Acland (1996), English drummer for the band Lush, hanging
 Art Acord (1931), American actor and rodeo champion, ingestion of poison
 Manuel Acuña (1873), Mexican poet, ingestion of potassium cyanide
 George Washington Adams (1829), American politician, lawyer, and eldest son of John Quincy Adams, drowning in Long Island Sound
 Marian Hooper Adams (1885), American socialite and photographer, potassium cyanide
 Phillip Adams (2021), American football player, gunshot
 Robert Adams Jr. (1906), Congressman from Pennsylvania, gunshot
 Stanley Adams (1977), American actor and screenwriter, gunshot wound.
 Stephanie Adams (2018), American former glamour model, known as the November 1992 Playboy Playmate, jump from a 25th floor window after having murdered her 7-year-old son Vincent by pushing him out first
 Stuart Adamson (2001), Scottish guitarist and singer for Big Country and Skids, hanging after alcohol ingestion
 Adrastus (c. 550s BC), exiled son of Gordias, king of Phrygia
 Vibulenus Agrippa (36 AD), Roman equestrian, poison
 Ahn Jae-hwan (2008), South Korean actor, carbon monoxide poisoning
 Aizong of Jin (1234), Chinese emperor of the Jin dynasty
 Chantal Akerman (2015), Belgian film director
 Sergey Akhromeyev (1991), Marshal of the Soviet Union, hanging
 Stephen Akinmurele (1999), British suspected serial killer, hanging
 Ryūnosuke Akutagawa (1927), Japanese writer, overdose of barbital
 Marwan al-Shehhi (2001), United Arab Emirates member of Al-Qaeda and one of the 9/11 hijackers, plane crash of United Airlines Flight 175.
 Alcetas (320 BC), Hellenic general of Alexander the Great
 Leelah Alcorn (2014), American transgender teenager, walked in front of a truck
 Leandro Alem (1896), Argentine politician, founder of the Radical Civic Union, gunshot to the head
 Alexander (220 BC), Seleucid satrap of Persis.
 Ross Alexander (1937), American actor, gunshot to the head
 Ekaterina Alexandrovskaya (2020), Russian-Australian ice skater, jumped from window of her apartment
 Ghazaleh Alizadeh (1996), Iranian poet and writer, hanging
 Gia Allemand (2013), American actress and model, hanging
 Salvador Allende (1973), 28th president of Chile, gunshot
 Nadezhda Alliluyeva (1932), wife of Joseph Stalin, gunshot
 Jeff Alm (1993), American football player, gunshot
 Jason Altom (1998), American Ph.D. student, potassium cyanide
 August Ames (2017), Canadian pornographic actress, hanging
 Jean Améry (1978), Austrian writer, overdose of sleeping pills
 Amphicrates of Athens (86 BC), Greek sophist and rhetorician, starved himself
 Korechika Anami (1945), Japanese War Minister, stabbed himself as part of ritual seppuku disembowelment
 Adna Anderson (1889), General, U.S. Military Railroads during the American Civil War, railroad civil engineer/manager, gunshot
 Forrest Howard Anderson (1989), Governor of Montana, gunshot
 Mary A. Anderson (1996), unidentified woman using an alias, cyanide poisoning
 Keith Andes (2005), American actor, asphyxiation
 Andragathius (388 AD), Roman general and Magister equitum who assassinated emperor Gratian, drowned in the sea
 Andromachus (364 BC). Eleian cavalry general
 Odysseas Angelis (1987), Greek general and head of the Hellenic Armed Forces during the Greek Junta, hanging
 Roger Angleton (1998), American murderer, cut himself over 50 times with a razor
 Publius Rufus Anteius (67 AD), Roman politician, drank poison and cut his veins
 Mark Antony (30 BC), Roman politician and general, stabbed with sword.
 Kei Aoyama (2011), Japanese manga artist, hanging
 Marcus Gavius Apicius (before 40 AD), Roman socialite, gourmet and man of great wealth, poison
 Marshall Applewhite (1997), American leader of the Heaven's Gate religious cult, poisoned himself as part of the cult's mass suicide that year
 Araki Yukio (1945), Japanese kamikaze pilot
 Arbogast (394 AD), Roman general
 Diane Arbus (1971), American photographer, overdosed on pills and slashed wrists
 Archias of Cyprus (between 158 and 154 BC), Ptolemaic governor of Cyprus, hanging
 Reinaldo Arenas (1990), Cuban-American artist and writer, drug and alcohol overdose
 José María Arguedas (1969), Peruvian novelist and poet, gunshot
 Pedro Armendáriz (1963), Mexican actor, gunshot
 Edwin Armstrong (1954), American inventor of FM radio, jumped from a 13th floor window
 Arria (42 AD), Roman wife of Caecina Paetus an alleged conspirator against Emperor Claudius, stabbed herself.
 Sei Ashina (2020) Japanese actress
 Ottilie Assing (1884), German writer, journalist, feminist and abolitionist, swallowing potassium cyanide
 John Atchison (2007), American federal prosecutor and alleged child sex offender, hanging
 Mohamed Atta (2001), Egyptian member of Al-Qaeda, and leader of the 9/11 hijackers, plane crash of American Airlines Flight 11.
 Pekka-Eric Auvinen (2007), Finnish Jokela High School shooter, gunshot to head
 Avicii (2018), Swedish DJ and music producer, exsanguination from cuts
 Mike Awesome (2007), American professional wrestler, hanging
 Marion Aye (1951), American actress, ingestion of bi-chloride of mercury tablets
 May Ayim (1996), German author, jumped from 13th floor of a Berlin building
 Albert Ayler (1970), American jazz saxophonist, jumped into New York City's East River

B

 Andreas Baader (1977), German RAF terrorist, gunshot.
 Nikki Bacharach (2007), American daughter of Burt Bacharach and Angie Dickinson, suffocation using plastic bag and helium
 Josef Bachmann (1970), German anti-communist, who made an assassination attempt on the German student movement-leader Rudi Dutschke, asphyxiation with plastic bag
 Faith Bacon (1956), American burlesque dancer and actress, jumped from hotel window
 Abu Bakr al-Baghdadi (2019), Iraqi-born Islamic terrorist and leader of the Islamic State of Iraq and the Levant, detonation of a suicide vest
 Bai Qi (257 BC), Chinese general and commander of the Qin army, cut his throat with a sword
 David Bairstow (1998), English cricketer, hanging
 James Robert Baker (1997), American writer, asphyxiation
 Mark Balelo (2013), American cast member on the reality TV series Storage Wars, carbon monoxide asphyxiation
 Joe Ball (1938), American serial killer, gunshot
 José Manuel Balmaceda (1891), President of Chile, gunshot
 Lou Bandy (1959), Dutch singer and comedian
 Pratyusha Banerjee (2016), Indian actress, hanging
 Somen Banerjee (1994), Indian American entrepreneur, co-founder of Chippendales and convicted criminal, hanging
 Bantcho Bantchevsky (1988), Bulgarian American singer, jump from New York Metropolitan Opera balcony
 Herculine Barbin (1868), French intersex memoirist, gas
 Erich Bärenfänger (1945), German general
 Robert Hayward Barlow (1951), American writer and anthropologist, barbiturate overdose
 Boris Barnet (1965), Russian film director, hanging
 Uwe Barschel (1987), German politician, ingested five sleeping potions 
 Mark O. Barton (1999), American spree killer, gunshot
 Ralph Barton (1931), American artist, gunshot
 Johanna Bassani (2020), Austrian combined Nordic skier and ski jumper
 Pierre Batcheff (1932), French actor, overdose of barbital
 Simone Battle (2014), American pop singer and member of the band G.R.L., hanging
 Herb Baumeister (1996), American serial killer, gunshot
 J. Clifford Baxter (2002), American Enron Corporation executive, gunshot
 Amelie "Melli" Beese (1925), German pioneer aviator, gunshot
 Ari Behn (2019), Norwegian author and painter
 Jovan Belcher (2012), American football player, gunshot, murder-suicide
 Peter Bellamy (1991), English folk musician and member of the band The Young Tradition
 Malik Bendjelloul (2014), Swedish documentary filmmaker, jumped in front of moving train
 Brenda Benet (1982), American television and film actress, gunshot
 Walter Benjamin (1940), German-Jewish literary critic and culture theorist, morphine overdose
 Jill Bennett (1990), English actress, secobarbital overdose
 Chester Bennington (2017), American lead singer of Linkin Park, hanging
 Louis Bennison (1929), American actor, gunshot
 Chris Benoit (2007), Canadian professional wrestler, hanging
 Pierre Bérégovoy (1993), French politician and Prime Minister (1992–93), gunshot
 Mary Kay Bergman (1999), American voice actress, gunshot
 Marty Bergen (1900), American baseball player, cut throat with a razor after killing his family with an ax
 David Berman (2019), American musician and poet, hanging
 John Berryman (1972), American poet, jumped off the Washington Avenue Bridge in Minneapolis, Minnesota
 Bruno Bettelheim (1990). Austrian-born U.S. psychologist and writer, asphyxiation with plastic bag
 Paul Bhattacharjee (2013), British actor, jumped from a clifftop
 Brian Bianchini (2004), American model, hanging
 Steve Bing (2020), American businessman and film producer, jumped from 27th floor of apartment building
 Bob Birch (2012), American musician, gunshot
 David Birnie (2005), Australian serial killer and rapist, hanging
 Jens Bjørneboe (1976), Norwegian novelist, hanging
 Eli M. Black (1975), CEO of United Fruit Co., jumped out of a building
 Junius Blaesus (31 AD), Roman consul, general and governor of Africa, fell on a sword
 Jeremy Blake (2007), American artist, drowning
 Clara Blandick (1962), American stage and screen actress
 Erica Blasberg (2010), American golfer, asphyxia caused prescription overdose
 Miguel Blesa (2017), Spanish banker and businessman, involved in various corruption scandals, gunshot to chest
 Vasily Blokhin (1955), Soviet general and NKVD executioner
 Adele Blood (1936), American actress, gunshot
 Clara Bloodgood (1907), American Broadway actress, gunshot
 Gaius Blossius (c. 129 BC), Roman philosopher and adviser to Tiberius Gracchus and Eumenes III
 Isabella Blow (2007), English magazine editor, and muse to fashion designer Alexander McQueen, poisoning
 Ludwig Boltzmann (1906), Austrian physicist, known for thermodynamics and atomic theory, hanging
 Bonosus (280 AD), Roman usurper, hanging
 Eduardo Bonvallet (2015), Chilean World Cup footballer and pundit, hanging
 Jeremy Michael Boorda (1996), US Chief of Naval Operations, gunshot to the chest
 Éric Borel (1995), French high school student and spree killer, gunshot
 Adrian Borland (1999), English singer-songwriter (The Outsiders, The Sound), jumped in front of a moving train
 Martin Bormann (1945), German head of the Nazi Party Chancellery, cyanide poisoning.
 Jean-Louis Bory (1979), French writer, gunshot to the chest
 Yevgenia Bosch (1925), Soviet Bolshevik revolutionary and politician, gunshot
 Novak Bošković (2019), Serbian handball player, gunshot
 Dmitry Bosov (2020), Russian businessman and billionaire, gunshot
 Mohamed Bouazizi (2011), Tunisian street vendor, self-immolation
 Boudica (61 AD), Queen of the Iceni, poison
 Georges Ernest Boulanger (1891), French general and politician, gunshot
 Dallen Bounds (1999), American serial killer, gunshot
 Anthony Bourdain (2018), American chef, author, and television personality, hanging
 Tommy Boyce (1994), American songwriter, gunshot
 Karin Boye (1941), Swedish writer
 Charles Boyer (1978), French actor, secobarbital overdose
 Jonathan Brandis (2003), American actor, hanging
 Cheyenne Brando (1995), Tahitian model/actress, hanging
 Charlie Brandt (2004), American serial killer, hanging
 Mike Brant (1975), Israeli pop star jumped from his Paris apartment building
 Robert Eugene Brashers (1999), American serial killer, gunshot
 Eva Braun (1945), German wife of Adolf Hitler, cyanide poisoning
 Richard Brautigan (1984), American writer, gunshot
 Brennus (279 BC), Gallic tribal leader and general, stabbed himself
 James E. Brewton (1967), American painter and printmaker, gunshot
 Lilya Brik (1978), Russian author and socialite, overdose of sleeping pills
 Molly Brodak (2020), American poet, writer, and baker
 Herman Brood (2001), Dutch rock musician and painter, jumped from hotel roof
 Joseph Brooks (2011), American screenwriter, director, producer, and composer, asphyxiation
 May Brookyn (1894), British stage actress, overdose of carbolic acid
 John Munro Bruce (1901), Australian businessman, father of Prime Minister S. M. Bruce
 Jürgen Brümmer (2014), German Olympic gymnast, jumped from the Koersch Viaduct after suffocating his son
 Marcus Junius Brutus the Younger (42 BC), Roman politician and conspirator to assassinate Julius Caesar, ran into his sword
 Roy Buchanan (1988), American guitarist and blues musician, hanging
 David Buckel (2018), American LGBT rights lawyer and environmental activist, self-immolation in Prospect Park, Brooklyn
 Randy Budd (2016), American businessman whose wife, Sharon, was critically injured and disfigured by rocks thrown at their car from an overpass, gunshot
 Eustace Budgell (1737), English writer and politician, drowning in the Thames
 Brad Bufanda (2017), American actor, jumped from building
 Dale Buggins (1981), Australian stunt motorcyclist, gunshot
 Wilhelm Burgdorf (1945), German general, Chief of the Heerespersonalamt and Chief Adjutant to Adolf Hitler, gunshot.
 Dan Burros (1965), Jewish American neo-Nazi activist and member of the Ku Klux Klan, gunshot to the head
 August Anheuser Busch Sr. (1934), American CEO of Anheuser-Busch, gunshot
 Germán Busch (1939), Bolivian military officer and 41st and 43rd President of Bolivia, gunshot
 Zvonko Bušić (2013), Croatian hijacker responsible for hijacking TWA Flight 355 in 1976, gunshot

C

 Cai Lun (121 AD), Chinese eunuch court official, imperial adviser, inventor of paper and the modern papermaking process, poison
 Calanus (323 BC), Indian gymnosophist and companion of Alexander the Great, self-immolation
 Novius Calavius (314 BC), Campanian nobleman, leader of an anti-Roman insurrection.
 Ovius Calavius (314 BC), Campanian nobleman, leader of an anti-Roman insurrection.
 Lucius Arruntius Camillus Scribonianus (42 AD), Roman politician, consul and rebel against Emperor Claudius
 Donald Cammell (1996), Scottish film director, gunshot
 Homaro Cantu (2015), American chef, hanging
 Capital Steez (2012), American hip-hop artist, jumped off the rooftop of the Cinematic Music Group headquarters in Manhattan
 Capucine (1990), French actress and model, jumped from an eighth-floor apartment
 George Caragonne (1995), American comic book writer, jumped from the 45th floor of the Marriott Marquis Hotel in Manhattan
 Wallace Carothers (1937), American inventor of nylon, cyanide poisoning
 Dora Carrington (1932), English artist, gunshot
 Kevin Carter (1994), South African photojournalist, carbon monoxide poisoning
 Tim Carter (2008), English footballer, hanging
 Justina Casagli (1841), Swedish opera singer, jumped out a window
 Finn M. W. Caspersen (2009), American financier and philanthropist, gunshot
 Gaius Cassius Longinus (42 BC), Roman politician, general and conspirator to assassinate Julius Caesar, fell on his sword
 Camilo Castelo Branco (1890), Portuguese novelist
 Ariel Castro (2013), Puerto Rican-American kidnapper, rapist and murderer, hanging
 Fidel Castro Diaz-Balart (2018), Cuban nuclear physicist, son of Fidel Castro
 Kelly Catlin (2019), American cycling champion
 Cato the Younger (46 BC), Roman statesman and politician, stabbed with sword
 Paul Celan (1970), Romanian poet, drowning in the Seine
 Censorinus (53 BC), Roman cavalryman and friend of Publius Licinius Crassus, ordered shieldbearer to stab him.
 Champignon (2013), Brazilian musician, bassist for Charlie Brown Jr., gunshot
 Joseph Newton Chandler III (2002), formerly unidentified identity thief, gunshot
 Pierre Chanal (2003), French serial killer, cut femoral artery
 Iris Chang (2004), American historian and author of The Rape of Nanking, gunshot to head
 Charmion (30 BC), servant and advisor of Cleopatra.
 Richard Chase (1980), American serial killer, anti-depressant overdose
 Gilles Châtelet (1999), French philosopher and mathematician
 Thomas Chatterton (1770), English poet and forger, arsenic poisoning
 Gu Cheng (1993), Chinese poet, hanging
 Danny Chen (2011), Chinese-American U.S. Army Private, gunshot
 Vic Chesnutt (2009), American singer-songwriter, muscle relaxant overdose
 Leslie Cheung (2003), Hong Kong singer and actor, leapt from the 24th floor of the Mandarin Oriental hotel
 Chimalpopoca (1428), Emperor of Tenochtitlan, hanging
 V. J. Chitra (2020), Indian actress, hanging
 Seung-Hui Cho (2007), American university student who perpetrated the Virginia Tech shooting, gunshot
 Choi Jin-sil (2008), South Korean actress, hanging
 Choi Jin-young (2010), South Korean actor and singer, hanging
 Chongzhen (1644), Chinese emperor of the Ming dynasty
 David Christie (1997), French singer
 Brian Christopher (2018), American professional wrestler, hanging
 Christine Chubbuck (1974), American television reporter, gunshot
Chung Doo-un (2019), South Korean politician
Diana Churchill (1963), Eldest daughter of British Prime Minister Winston Churchill, barbiturate overdose
Frank Churchill (1942), American film composer, gunshot
 Bob Carlos Clarke (2006), Irish photographer, jumped in front of a train
 Jeremiah Clarke (1707), English baroque composer and organist, gunshot
 Paul Clayton (1967) American folksinger and folklorist, electrocution
 Tyler Clementi (2010), Rutgers University student, jumped off the George Washington Bridge
 Robert George Clements (1947), Irish physician and suspected murderer, morphine overdose
 Cleomenes I (c. 489 BC), King of Sparta, slashed himself from shins to belly
 Cleomenes III (219 BC), King of Sparta
 Cleombrotus of Ambracia (after 399 BC), Greek philosopher, acquaintance of Socrates and Plato
 Cleopatra (30 BC), Queen of Egypt, inducing an asp to bite her.
 Kurt Cobain (1994), American singer/songwriter, and frontman of the band Nirvana, gunshot
 Jack Cole (1958), American cartoonist known as the creator of Plastic Man, gunshot to the head with a rifle
 Ray Combs (1996), American comedian, actor, and television game show host, hanging
 Camila María Concepción (2020), American screenwriter and transgender rights activist
 Louis Conradt (2006) assistant district attorney from Texas, gunshot
 Adolfo Constanzo (1989), American serial killer, drug dealer, warlock and cult leader, ordered a follower to shoot him
 Tarka Cordell (2008) British musician, hanging
 Don Cornelius (2012), American television producer, best known as the creator and host of Soul Train, gunshot
Chris Cornell (2017), American musician, singer/songwriter, and member of the bands Soundgarden and Audioslave, hanging after a performance
 Tony Costa (1974), American serial killer, hanging
 John Coughlin (2019), American figure skater, hanging
 Hart Crane (1932), American poet, jumped off ship
 Darby Crash (1980), American singer (Germs), heroin overdose
 Publius Licinius Crassus (53 BC), Roman general, ordered shieldbearer to stab him
 Robert W. Criswell (1905), American humorist and newspaperman, jumped in front of subway train
 Dennis Crosby (1991), American singer and actor, gunshot
 Harry Crosby (1929), American poet and publisher, gunshot
 Lindsay Crosby (1989), American singer and actor, gunshot
 Julee Cruise (2022), American musician
 Charles Crumb (1992), American comics writer and artist and brother of cartoonist Robert Crumb, overdosed on pills
 Andrew Cunanan (1997), American spree killer, gunshot
 Lester Cuneo (1925), American actor, gunshot
 Will Cuppy (1949), American humorist, sleeping pill overdose
 Ian Curtis (1980), English singer-songwriter (Joy Division), hanging
 Patricia Cutts (1974), English film and television actress, barbiturate overdose
 Adam Czerniaków (1942), Polish-Jewish senator and head of the Warsaw Ghetto Judenrat, cyanide poisoning

D

 Stig Dagerman (1954), Swedish journalist and writer, carbon monoxide poisoning
 Dalida (1987), French-Italian singer, barbiturate overdose
 Andrea Dandolo (1298), Venetian admiral, beating his head repeatedly against his flagship's mast
 Karl Dane (1934), Danish-American silent film actor, gunshot
 Laurie Dann (1988), American murderer and arsonist, gunshot to the head
 Monika Dannemann (1996), German skater and painter, carbon monoxide exhaust fumes
 Bella Darvi (1971), Polish actress, gas inhalation
 Ali-Akbar Davar (1937), Iranian politician, judge and the founder of the modern judicial system of Iran, overdose of opium
 Brad Davis (1991), American actor, assisted barbiturate overdose
 Charlotte Dawson (2014), Australian TV presenter, hanging
 Osamu Dazai (1948), Japanese author, drowning in the Tamagawa Aqueduct
 Alice de Janzé (1941), American heiress, gunshot
 Decebalus (106 AD), King of Dacia
 Decentius (353 AD), Roman usurper.
 Guy Debord (1994), French philosopher and founder of the Situationists International, gunshot
 Jeanine Deckers (1985), Belgian musician known as the Singing Nun, overdose of sedatives
 Albert Dekker (1968), actor known for the science fiction film Dr. Cyclops, autoerotic asphyxiation.
 Gilles Deleuze (1995), French philosopher, jumped out of window
 Peter Delmé (1770), English politician, gunshot
 Brad Delp (2007), American singer-songwriter for the bands Boston and RTZ, carbon monoxide poisoning
 Penelope Delta (1941), Greek writer, poison.
 Demonax (c. 170 AD), Greek Cypriot Cynic philosopher, starved himself to death
 Demosthenes (322 BC), Greek statesman, poison.
 Karl Denke (1924), German serial killer, hanging
 Jerry Desmonde (1967), English actor
 Patrick Dewaere (1982), French actor, gunshot
 Diaeus (146 BC), Greek strategos of the Achaean League, poison
 Ding Ruchang (1895), Chinese admiral, opium overdose
 Dioxippus (after 336 BC), ancient Greek pankratiast and Olympic champion, fell upon his sword
 Tove Ditlevsen (1976), Danish poet and author
 Dipendra Bir Bikram Shah (2001), King of Nepal and perpetrator of the Nepalese royal massacre, gunshot to the head
 Thomas M. Disch (2008), American writer, gunshot
 Adriaan Ditvoorst (1987), Dutch film director and screenwriter, drowning
 Julia Domna (217 AD), Roman empress, second wife of Emperor Septimius Severus
 Christopher Dorner (2013), former American police officer and mass shooter, gunshot
 Michael Dorris (1997), American novelist, overdose of sleeping pills with vodka and asphyxiation
 Jon Dough (2006), American pornographic actor, hanging
 Francis Douglas, Viscount Drumlanrig (1894),  British nobleman and Liberal politician, gunshot

 Edward Downes (2009), English conductor, assisted double suicide with wife Lady Joan Downes at the Dignitas clinic in Switzerland
 Scott Dozier (2019), American murderer, hanging
 Charmaine Dragun (2007), Australian television newsreader, jumped off The Gap
 Lynwood Drake (1992), American spree killer, gunshot
 Nick Drake (1974), English singer-songwriter, overdose of amitriptyline tablets
 Marcus Livius Drusus Claudianus (42 BC), Roman senator
Pete Duel (1971), American actor, gunshot
Dave Duerson (2011), American football safety for the Chicago Bears, New York Giants, and Phoenix Cardinals, gunshot to the chest
 Theresa Duncan (2007), American video game designer, blogger, filmmaker and critic, ingestion of Tylenol and alcohol
 R. Budd Dwyer (1987), American politician, gunshot to mouth

E

 George Eastman (1932), American inventor and philanthropist, gunshot to heart
 Volker Eckert (2007), German serial killer, hanging
 Edward I. Edwards (1931), American politician, gunshot to head
 Mack Ray Edwards (1971), American serial killer, hanging
 Naima El Bezaz (2020), Moroccan-Dutch writer
 Keith Emerson (2016), English rock musician, keyboardist, and composer for the bands The Nice and Emerson, Lake & Palmer, gunshot to the head
Martin Emond (2004), New Zealand cartoonist and painter, hanging
 Empedocles (c. 430 BC), Greek philosopher, leapt into Mount Etna
 Robert Enke (2009), German footballer, struck by train
 Gudrun Ensslin (1977), German RAF terrorist, hanging.
 Peg Entwistle (1932), Welsh-born American actress, leapt from the "H" in the Hollywood Sign
 Epicharis (65 AD), Roman leading member of the Pisonian conspiracy, strangled herself with a band of cloth
 Eratosthenes (194 BC), Greek polymath and chief librarian at the Library of Alexandria, voluntary starvation
 Ermanaric (376 AD), king of the Greuthungi
 Etika (2019), American YouTuber and streamer, drowned after jumping from the Manhattan Bridge
 Euphrates the Stoic (118 AD), Roman Stoic philosopher, hemlock poisoning
 Eurydice II of Macedon (317 BC), Queen of Macedon, hanging
 Tom Evans (1983), English musician and songwriter for the group Badfinger, hanging.
 Richard Evonitz (2002), American serial killer and kidnapper

F

Angus Fairhurst (2008), English artist, hanging
 Enevold de Falsen (1808), Norwegian Supreme Court Justice, drowning
 Moni Fanan (2009), Israeli basketball executive Maccabi Tel Aviv, hanging
 Gaius Fuficius Fango (40 BC), Roman general and politician
 Fausto Fanti (2014), Brazilian humorist known as a member of the comedy troupe Hermes & Renato, and guitarist for Massacration, hanging
 Richard Farnsworth (2000), American actor, gunshot
 Justin Fashanu (1998), British footballer, hanging
 René Favaloro (2000), Argentine cardiac surgeon (created technique for coronary bypass surgery), gunshot to the heart
 José Feghali (2014), Brazilian pianist, winner of the 1985 Van Cliburn International Piano Competition, gunshot to head
 Anton Fier (2022), American drummer, composer and bandleader, assisted suicide
 Hans Fischer (1945), German organic chemist and recipient of the 1930 Nobel Prize in Chemistry
 Hermann Emil Fischer (1919), German chemist and recipient of the 1902 Nobel Prize in Chemistry
 Mark Fisher (2017), English writer and political theorist, hanging
 Robert FitzRoy (1865), English meteorologist, surveyor, hydrographer, Governor of New Zealand and captain of  during Charles Darwin's second voyage of HMS Beagle, slit throat
 Quintus Fulvius Flaccus (172 BC), Roman consul, hanging
 Caroline Flack (2020), English radio and television presenter, hanging
 Ed Flanders (1995), American actor, gunshot
 John Bernard Flannagan (1942), American sculptor
 Frederick Fleet (1965), English sailor and lookout on the RMS Titanic who first spotted the iceberg that struck the vessel, hanging
 Mark Fleischman (2022), American businessman and onetime owner of Studio 54, assisted suicide with the aid of the assisted dying non-profit Dignitas
 Keith Flint (2019), English singer and dancer for The Prodigy, hanging
 Charley Ford (1884), American outlaw, gunshot
 Tom Forman (1926), American actor, director and producer, gunshot
 André "Dédé" Fortin (2000), Canadian songwriter, singer and guitarist (Les Colocs), stabbing
 Vince Foster (1993), American attorney and Deputy White House Counsel to Bill Clinton, gunshot to mouth
 Jason David Frank (2022), American actor known for the TV seris Mighty Morphin Power Rangers, hanging
 Wade Frankum (1991), Australian mass murderer who perpetrated the Strathfield massacre, gunshot
 Kelly Fraser (2019), Canadian pop singer and songwriter
 Ryan Freel (2012), American professional baseball player, gunshot
 John Friedrich (1991), Australian fraudster, gunshot
 Emil Fuchs (1929), Austrian-American sculptor, gunshot
 Fujimura Misao (1902), Japanese philosophy student and poet, jumped from the Kegon Falls
 Travis Fulton (2021), American boxer and mixed martial artist fighter, hanging
 Anton Furst (1991), English production designer on Batman (1989), jump from an eighth story parking garage

G

 Anthony Galindo (2020), Venezuelan singer
 Alan García (2019), Peruvian politician who served as President of Peru from 1985 to 1990 and again from 2006 to 2011, gunshot
 Jamir Garcia (2020), Filipino singer, vocalist of the band Slapshock, hanging
Santiago García (2021), Uruguayan soccer player, gunshot
Danny Gatton (1994), American guitarist, gunshot
 John Geddert (2021), American gymnastics coach, gunshot shortly after being charged with 24 felony counts related to sexual abuse of his trainees
 Helen Palmer (1967), American author and actress who was the first wife of famed children's author Theodor "Dr. Seuss" Geisel, barbiturate overdose
 Richard Gerstl (1908), Austrian painter, stabbing and hanging
 Babak Ghorbani (2014), Iranian wrestler, overdose
 Jeremy Giambi (2022), American retired baseball player, gunshot to chest
 Karl Giese (1938), German archivist, museum curator and life partner of Magnus Hirschfeld
 Gildo (398 AD), Roman Berber general and rebel leader, hanging
 Rex Gildo (1999), German singer and actor, jump from his third-floor apartment window
 Sam Gillespie (2003), philosopher whose writings and translations were crucial to the initial reception of Alain Badiou's work in the English-speaking world
 Claude Gillingwater (1939), American actor, gunshot
 Charlotte Perkins Gilman (1935), American writer, chloroform overdose
 Kurt Gloor (1997), Swiss film director, screenwriter and producer
 John Wayne Glover (2005), Australian serial killer, hanging
 Holly Glynn (1987), a formerly unidentified young woman found in Dana Point, California, who had jumped off a cliff. Her body was not identified until 2015
 Jean-Luc Godard (2022), French-Swiss film director and film critic, assisted suicide procedure.
 Joseph Goebbels (1945), Nazi politician and Propaganda Minister, gunshot or cyanide poisoning.
 Magda Goebbels (1945), German wife of Joseph Goebbels, assisted suicide by gunshot or cyanide poisoning.
 Gongsun Zan (199 AD), Chinese general and warlord, setting himself and his family on fire
 David Goodall (2018), English-born Australian botanist and ecologist, physician-assisted suicide
 Gordian I (238 AD), Roman emperor, hanging
 Adam Lindsay Gordon (1870), Australian poet, gunshot
 Lucy Gordon (2009), English actress and model, hanging
 Gōri Daisuke (2010), Japanese voice actor, narrator and actor, cut his wrist
 Hermann Göring (1946), German politician, military leader, major figure in Nazi Party, potassium cyanide
 Arshile Gorky (1948), Armenian American painter; hanging
 Joachim Gottschalk (1941), German stage and film actor, gas inhalation
 Gaius Gracchus (121 BC), Roman politician, reformer and tribune, ordered a slave to kill him
 Eddie Graham (1985), American professional wrester, gunshot 
 Frank Graham (1950), American voice actor and radio announcer, carbon monoxide poisoning
 Mike Graham (2012), American professional wrestler, gunshot
 Phil Graham (1963), American newspaper publisher, shotgun
 Sophie Gradon (2018), English model and television personality, hanging
 Wolfgang Grams (1993), German RAF terrorist, gunshot
 Bob Grant (2003), English actor, carbon monoxide poisoning
 Shauna Grant (1984), American porn actress, gunshot
 Spalding Gray (2004), American actor, playwright, screenwriter, performance artist, and monologuist, jumped off the Staten Island Ferry
 Mark Green (2004), American record-setting minor league hockey star, hanging
 Larry Grey (1951), English magician and actor, gunshot
 Walter Groß (1945), German physician, politician, eugenicist and race theorist
 Carl Großmann (1922), German serial killer, hanging
 Theodor Grotthuss (1822), German chemist
 Paul Gruchow (2004), American writer, drug overdose

H

 Charles Haddon (2010), English lead singer of pop-synth band Ou Est Le Swimming Pool, hanging
 Charlie Haeger (2020), American baseball player, gunshot
 Jason Hairston (2018), American football player
 Lillian Hall-Davis (1933), English actress, carbon monoxide poisoning and cut throat
 Ryan Halligan (2003), bullied American middle school student, hanging
 Pete Ham (1975), Welsh singer-songwriter and guitarist for the band Badfinger, hanging.
 Tony Halme (2010), Finnish athlete, actor and politician, gunshot
 Bernardine Hamaekers (1912), Belgian opera singer, cut throat with shattered drinking glass
 Rusty Hamer (1990), American actor, gunshot
 Hamilcar I of Carthage (480 BC), King of Carthage, self-immolation
 David Hamilton (2016), British photographer and filmmaker known for his nudes of pubescent girls, asphyxiation via plastic bag after several of his models accused him of rape
 Hampsicora (215 BC), Sardo-Punic political leader, landowner and anti-Roman rebel leader
 Tony Hancock (1968), English comedian, overdose by vodka and amphetamines
 Hannibal (ca 182 BC), Carthaginian commander during the Second Punic War, poison
Goo Hara (2019), South Korean singer
 James Harden-Hickey (1898), Franco-American author, newspaper editor, duellist, adventurer and self-proclaimed Prince of Trinidad, overdose of morphine
 Marlia Hardi (1984), Indonesian actress, hanging
 Eric Harris (1999), one of the two American high school seniors who committed the Columbine High School massacre, gunshot.
 Brynn Hartman (1998), wife of comedian and actor Phil Hartman, shot herself after murdering Hartman
 Elizabeth Hartman (1987), American actress, leapt out of fifth floor window
 Walter Hasenclever (1940), German poet and playwright, overdose of Veronal
 Neda Hassani (2003), Iranian protester, self-immolation in front of French embassy in London
 Charles Ray Hatcher (1984), American serial killer, hanging
 Donny Hathaway (1979), American musician, jumped from the 15th floor window of his hotel room
 Phyllis Haver (1960), American silent film actress, barbiturate overdose
 Sadegh Hedayat (1951), Iranian writer, carbon monoxide poisoning
 Marvin Heemeyer (2004), American welder who went on a rampage with a modified bulldozer, gunshot
 Sarah Hegazi (2020), Egyptian LGBT activist
Claudia Heill (2011), Austrian judoka, jump from a sixth story window
 Ernest Hemingway (1961), American writer and journalist, gunshot to head
 Margaux Hemingway (1996), American fashion model, actress; overdose of phenobarbital
 Benjamin Hendrickson (2006), American actor, gunshot
 George Hennard (1991), American mass murderer who perpetrated the Luby's shooting, gunshot
 Victor Heringer (2018), Brazilian novelist and poet, winner of the 2013 Prêmio Jabuti, self-defenestration
 Aaron Hernandez (2017), American football player and convicted murderer, hanging in prison cell, five days after his acquittal from a separate murder charge
 Rudolf Hess (1987), German Nazi leader, hanging
 Paul Hester (2005), Australian drummer for Split Enz and Crowded House, hanging
 John Hicklenton (2010), British comics artist, assisted suicide the Dignitas clinic in Switzerland
 hide (1998), Japanese heavy metal singer, songwriter and record producer for the metal band X Japan, hanging
 Virginia Hill (1966), American mobster, sedative overdose
 Himilco (396 BC), Carthaginian general, starving himself
 Heinrich Himmler (1945), German Nazi leader, cyanide
 Ludwig Hirsch (2011), Austrian singer, songwriter and actor, jumped from the second floor of a hospital window
 Adolf Hitler (1945), Austrian-born Nazi Germany dictator, gunshot (possibly while biting down on a cyanide capsule at the same time)
 Abbie Hoffman (1989), American political and social activist; phenobarbital overdose
 Crash Holly (2003), American wrestler, asphyxia due to pulmonary aspiration as a result of an alcohol and drug overdose
 Libby Holman (1971), American singer and actress, carbon monoxide poisoning
 Alec Holowka (2019), Canadian video game programmer, designer, and musician
 Tyler Honeycutt (2018), American basketball player (Sacramento Kings, Khimki), gunshot
 Doug Hopkins (1993), American songwriter and lead guitarist for the band Gin Blossoms, gunshot
 Brita Horn (1791), Swedish countess and courtier, drowning
 Harry Horse (2007), English author, illustrator, cartoonist and musician, stabbed himself 47 times in a murder-suicide
 Silvio Horta (2020), American screenwriter and television producer, gunshot
 Robert E. Howard (1936), American author probably best known for his character Conan the Barbarian, gunshot to the head
 Mike Howe (2021), American singer, and member of the heavy metal band Metal Church
 Hu Bo (2017), Chinese novelist and director
Jeanne Hébuterne (1920), French art model and artist, threw herself out of the fifth-floor window, grief-stricken over the death of her husband, Amedeo Modigliani
 Quentin Hubbard (1976), son of L. Ron Hubbard, gas
 Nicholas Hughes (2009), fisheries biologist, son of renowned poet Sylvia Plath, hanging
 Rodney Hulin (1996), American prison inmate who had been raped, hanging
 Lester Hunt (1954), United States Senator, gunshot
 Michael Hutchence (1997), Australian singer and songwriter (INXS), hanging
 Phyllis Hyman (1995), American singer-songwriter and actress, overdose of phenobarbital

I

 Imai Kanehira (1184), Japanese general, jump from his horse onto a sword he placed in his mouth
 Clara Immerwahr (1915), German chemist, gunshot
 William Inge (1973), American writer, carbon monoxide poisoning
 Arthur Crew Inman (1963), American poet, editor and author of one of the longest diaries on record
 Hideki Irabu (2011), Japanese professional baseball player, hanged
 Iras (30 BC), servant and advisor of Cleopatra.
 Isokelekel (17th century), semi-mythical conqueror of Pohnpei Island in the Carolines and father of the cultural system of modern Pohnpei, bled to death after severing penis
 Silius Italicus (c. 103 AD), Roman consul, orator, author and poet, starvation
 Juzo Itami (1997), Japanese actor and film director, jumped from building
 Bruce Ivins (2008), American microbiologist and suspect in the 2001 anthrax attacks, overdose of paracetamol

J

 Charles R. Jackson (1968), American writer, barbiturate overdose
 Marcel Jacob (2009), Swedish bassist for the hard rock bands Talisman and Yngwie Malmsteen
 Irwin L. Jacobs (2019), American businessman, CEO of Genmar Holdings, gunshot after murdering his wife
 M. Jaishankar (2018), Indian serial killer and rapist, slitting his own throat
 Rahmah ibn Jabir Al Jalhami (1826), Arab tribal leader, pirate captain and admiral, blew himself up with his ship and crew
 Jill Janus (2018), American lead singer of the metal band Huntress
 Jang Ja-yeon (2009), South Korean actress, hanging
 Rick Jason (2000), American actor, gunshot
Jaxon (2006), American cartoonist and illustrator
 Fatafat Jayalaxmi (1980), Indian actress, hanging
 Richard Jeni (2007), American standup comedian and actor, gunshot
 Herbert Turner Jenkins (1990), longest serving police chief of Atlanta, gunshot
 Ryan Jenkins (2009), American contestant on the 2009 reality TV series Megan Wants a Millionaire, hanging
Jeon Mi-seon (2019), South Korean actress, hanging
Jeong Da-bin (2007), South Korean actress, hanging
 Ji Yan (224 AD), Chinese official of the state of Eastern Wu, bureaucrat and reformer
Jiang Qing (1991), Chinese communist revolutionary, politician, actress, fourth wife of Mao Zedong and member of the Gang of Four, hanging
Empress Jingyin (82 AD), Chinese imperial consort for Emperor Zhang of Han also known as Consort Song
Prince Joachim of Prussia (1920), son of Wilhelm II, German Emperor, gunshot
Adolph Joffe (1927), Soviet revolutionary and Left Oppositionist, gunshot
Jo Min-ki (2018), South Korean actor, hanging
 B. S. Johnson (1973), English novelist, poet, literary critic, sports journalist, television producer and filmmaker, cut his wrists
 Dan Johnson (2017), American politician, Republican member of the Kentucky House of Representatives, gunshot
 George Robert Johnston (2004), Canadian burglar and fugitive known as the Ballarat Bandit, gunshot
 Greg Johnson (2019), Canadian ice hockey player, gunshot
 J.J. Johnson (2001), American Bebop trombonist, gunshot
 Daniel V. Jones (1998), American maintenance worker, gunshot
 Jim Jones (1978), American cult leader and founder of Peoples Temple, gunshot
 Malcolm Jones III (1996), American comic book creator known for his work on Vertigo series The Sandman
 Ingrid Jonker (1965), South African poet, drowning
Tor Jonsson (1951), Norwegian poet
 Luc Jouret (1994), Belgian religious leader and co-founder of Order of the Solar Temple
 Pavle Jovanonic (2020), Serbian-American Olympic bobsledder
 Juba I of Numidia (46 BC), King of Numidia, double-suicide by sword with Marcus Petreius.
 Judacilius (90 BC), Piceni general and leader, swallowed poison and ordered to be set on fire
 Naomi Judd (2022), American country music singer and actress, gunshot
 Claude Jutra (1987), Canadian film director, actor and screenwriter, drowning

K

 Kari Kairamo (1988), Finnish CEO and chairman of telecommunications company Nokia, hanging
 Romas Kalanta (1972), Lithuanian high school student, self-immolation
 Antonie Kamerling (2010), Dutch actor and musician, hanging
 Sayaka Kanda (2021), Japanese actress and singer, jumped from an upper floor of a hotel
 Sarah Kane (1999), English writer, hanging
 Chris Kanyon (2010), American professional wrestler, overdose of anti-depressant pills
 Kostas Karyotakis (1928), Greek poet, gunshot
 Ricky Kasso (1984), American murderer, hanging
 Bruno Kastner (1932), German actor, hanging
 Kazuhiko Katō (2009), Japanese musician, hanging
 Yasunari Kawabata (1972), Japanese writer, gassing
 Kawatsu Kentarō (1970), Japanese swimmer, self-immolation
 Andrew Kehoe (1927), American mass murderer, detonated truck full of dynamite while inside it
 Brian Keith (1997), American actor, gunshot
 Mike Kelley (2012), American artist, carbon monoxide poisoning
 Israel Keyes (2012), American serial killer, slit wrists and strangulation
 Jiah Khan (2013), British American actress of Indian descent, hanging
 Sahar Khodayari (2019), Iranian activist who self-immolated in front of the Islamic Revolutionary Court of Tehran
 Margot Kidder (2018), Canadian-American actress, known for her role as Lois Lane in Superman feature films, drug and alcohol overdose
 Daul Kim (2009), South Korean model and blogger, hanged in her Paris apartment
 Kim Ji-hoon (2013), South Korean singer-songwriter (Two Two) and actor, hanging
Kim Jong-hyun (2017), South Korean singer-songwriter, radio host, and member of boy band SHINee, carbon monoxide poisoning
 Kim Sung-il (1987), North Korean agent who, together with Kim Hyon-hui, was responsible for the Korean Air Flight 858 bombing, bit into a cyanide-laced cigarette
 Yu-ri Kim (2011), South Korean model, poison
 Hana Kimura (2020), Japanese wrestler, hydrogen sulfide poisoning
 Allyn King (1930), American actress, jumped from a fifth story window
 Syd King (1933), English footballer and football manager, ingestion of corrosive liquid
 Uday Kiran (2014), Indian actor, hanging
 Ernst Ludwig Kirchner (1938), German artist, gunshot
 Stan Kirsch (2020), American actor, hanging
 R. B. Kitaj (2007), American artist, suffocation
 John Kivela (2017), American politician, hanging
 Dylan Klebold (1999), one of the two American high school seniors who committed the Columbine High School massacre, gunshot.
 Heinrich von Kleist (1811), German author, poet and journalist, gunshot
 Billy Knight (2018), UCLA basketball player, blunt force injuries
 Ilse Koch (1967), Nazi war criminal, hanging
 Andrew Koenig (2010), American actor, hanging
Arthur Koestler (1983), Hungarian-British author, novelist known for the antitotalitarian novel Darkness At Noon, barbiturates
 Hannelore Kohl (2001), German wife of German Chancellor Helmut Kohl, overdose of sleeping pills
 Lawrence Kohlberg (1987), American developmental psychologist, drowning
 Takako Konishi (2001), Japanese office worker known for an urban legend surrounding her death, froze to death
 Fumimaro Konoe (1945), Japanese prime minister, poison
Ruslana Korshunova (2008), Kazakhstani model, aged 20, jumped from the ninth-floor balcony of her apartment in New York City
 Gé Korsten (1999), South African artist, gunshot
 Jerzy Kosinski (1991), Polish-born American writer, suffocation with plastic bag
Milica Kostić (1974), Serbian-Yugoslavian high school student, jump from the 12th floor of a building while fleeing a rapist
 Oleksandr Kovalenko (2010), Ukrainian football player and referee, jumped from his apartment
 Hans Krebs (1945), German general and Chief of Staff of the OKH, gunshot.
 Tim Kretschmer (2009), German student and mass shooter, gunshot
 Norbert Kröcher (2016), German 2 June Movement terrorist, gunshot
 Cheslie Kryst (2022), American model and presenter known as Miss USA 2019, jump from a Manhattan high-rise
 Aleksandr Krymov (1917), Russian general, gunshot to the heart
 Ashwani Kumar (2020), Indian police officer and politician who served as governor of Nagaland from 2013 to 2014, hanging
 Hsu Kun-yuan (2020), Taiwanese politician, jumped off his home
 Kuyili (1780), Indian freedom fighter, self-immolation
 Richard Kyanka (2021), American web developer and founder of Something Awful, gunshot.

L

 L'Inconnue de la Seine (late 1880s), unidentified French woman pulled out of the Seine, known for the influence of her death mask on literature and art
 Deborah Laake (2000), American columnist and writer, overdose of pills
 Titus Labienus (8 AD), Roman lawyer, orator and historian
 Leonard Lake (1985), American serial killer, ingesting cyanide capsules
 Paul Lambert (2020), British television journalist, producer and communications director
 Vilho Lampi (1936), Finnish painter, jumped from bridge
 Karen Lancaume (2005), French pornographic film actress, overdose of temazepam
 Carole Landis (1948), American actress, overdose of Secobarbital pills
 James Henry Lane (1866), American partisan, abolitionist, senator and Union general, gunshot to the head
 Andrew E. Lange (2010), American astrophysicist
 Hans Langsdorff (1939), German naval officer and Kapitän zur See, gunshot
 Adam Lanza (2012), perpetrator of the Sandy Hook Elementary School shooting, gunshot to the head
 Don Lapre (2011), American television pitchman noted for several products, cut throat with a razor blade
 Mariano José de Larra (1837), Spanish writer, gunshot
 Anna Laughlin (1937), American actress, gas poisoning
 Florence Lawrence (1938), Canadian-American silent film actress, poisoning
 Lee Eun-ju (2005), South Korean actress, slit wrists and hanging
 Lee Hye-Ryeon (2007), South Korean singer, known as U;Nee, hanging
 Jon Lee (2002), Welsh drummer for the British rock band Feeder, hanging
 Thomas H. Lee (2023), American financier, gunshot
 Valery Legasov (1988), Soviet-Russian inorganic chemist, member of the Chernobyl nuclear disaster commission, hanging
 Friedrich Leibacher (2001), Swiss mass murderer, gunshot
 Megan Leigh (1990), American pornographic actress, gunshot wound to the head
Lemp Family (1949), Four members of the St. Louis Lemp Brewing family, gunshots
 Dave Lepard (2006), Swedish singer and guitarist (Crashdïet), hanging
 Marc Lépine (1989), Canadian perpetrator of the École Polytechnique massacre, shot himself after killing 14 women
 Andrzej Lepper (2011), Polish politician known as the leader of Samoobrona RP (Self-Defense of the Republic of Poland), hanging
 Arnie Lerma (2018), American former Scientologist and critic of Scientology, gunshot
 Eugene Lester (1940), former Justice and Chief Justice of the Oklahoma Supreme Court, gunshot to the head
 Amy Levy (1889), British writer inhaling charcoal gas
 Harry Lew (2011), United States Marine, gunshot
 Ephraim Lewis (1994), English singer, jumped off a fourth floor balcony
 Robert Ley (1945), German Nazi politician and leader of the German Labour Front, hanging
 Chris Lighty (2012), American music industry executive and manager, gunshot
 lil' Chris (2015), English pop singer, hanging
 Lil Loaded (2021), American rapper, gunshot to head
 Max Linder (1925), French film and stage actor, double suicide with wife Hélène "Jean" Peters, veronal and morphine ingestion, cut wrists
 Vachel Lindsay (1931), American poet, poison
 Diane Linkletter (1969), American actress and daughter of Art Linkletter, jump from a sixth story window
 Mark Linkous (2010), American musician, gunshot to the heart
 Carlo Lizzani (2013), Italian film director, jumped from a balcony.
 Liu Rushi (1664), Chinese courtesan, Ming loyalist, poet, painter and calligrapher, hanging
 Willie Llewelyn (1893), Welsh cricketer, gunshot
 Philip Loeb (1955), American actor, sleeping pill overdose
Kevin James Loibl (2016), assassin of Christina Grimmie, gunshot
 Bernard Loiseau (2003), French chef, shotgun blast to the head
 Ellen Joyce Loo (2018), Canadian-Hong Kong musician, singer, songwriter, and co-founder of the folk-pop rock group at 17, fall from her high-rise apartment building
Daniele Alves Lopes (1993), teen whose jump from a building was broadcast on Brazilian national television
 Ricardo López (1996), Uruguayan-born American stalker who attempted to kill Icelandic singer Björk by sending a letter bomb, gunshot
 Lu Zhaolin (684 or 686), Chinese poet, drowning in the Ying River
 Andreas Lubitz (2015), co-pilot of Germanwings Flight 9525, plane crash
 Lucan (65 AD), Roman poet, cut veins
 Lucretia (c. 510 BC), Roman noblewoman, stabbed herself
 Ludwig II of Bavaria (1886), King of Bavaria, drowning
 Roman Lyashenko (2003), Russian NHL hockey player, hanging
 David Lytton (2015), a formerly unidentified British man found on Saddleworth Moor, strychnine

M

 Billy Mackenzie (1997), Scottish vocalist for the band The Associates, overdose of prescription drugs
 Naevius Sutorius Macro (38 AD), Roman prefect of the Praetorian Guard
 Magnentius (353 AD), Roman usurper
 Maurice Magnus (1920), American memoirist
 Mago (344 BC), Carthaginian admiral and general
 Bhaiyyu Maharaj (2018), Indian spiritual guru, gunshot
 George W. Maher (1926), American architect
 Joe Maini (1964), American jazz alto saxophonist, Russian Roulette
 Philipp Mainländer (1876), German poet and philosopher, hanged himself using a pile of copies of The Philosophy of Redemption as platform
Sean Malone (2020), American bassist
 Donald R. Manes (1986), American politician, stab wound to the chest
 Mădălina Manole (2010), Romanian pop singer, pesticide poisoning
 Michael Mantenuto (2017), American actor and ice hockey player, best known for his performance as Jack O'Callahan in the 2004 biopic Miracle, gunshot
 Richard Manuel (1986), Canadian pianist and lead singer for The Band, hanging
 Titus Clodius Eprius Marcellus (79 AD), Roman consul and senator, slit his throat with a razor
 Simone Mareuil (1954), French actress, self-immolation
 Michael Marin (2012), American businessman, cyanide pill
 Philip Markoff (2010), Medical student, Boston University
 Andrew Martinez (2006), American nudism activist who became known on the University of California, Berkeley campus as the "Naked Guy", suffocation
Williams Martínez (2021), Uruguayan soccer player
 Eleanor Marx (1898), socialist activist and younger daughter of Karl Marx, poison
 Thalia Massie (1963), American victim of violent crime which resulted in the heavily publicized Massie Trial, barbiturate overdose
 David Edward Maust (2006), American serial killer, hanging
 Maximian (310 AD), Roman emperor
 Vladimir Mayakovsky (1930), Russian and Soviet poet, gunshot
 Jacques Mayol (2001), French free diver and subject of the movie The Big Blue, hanging
 John McAfee (2021), British-American computer programmer, businessman and founder of the computer security software company McAfee, hanging
 Allyson McConnell (2013), Australian-Canadian woman who killed her two children, jumped off a bridge while in Australia
 Kid McCoy (1940), American world champion boxer, overdose of sleeping pills
 Mindy McCready (2013), American country music singer, gunshot
 Hector MacDonald (1903), British army major-general, gunshot
 Walt McDougall (1938), American cartoonist, gunshot
 Dan McGann (1910), American baseball player, gunshot
Evelyn McHale (1947), American bookkeeper, subject of an iconic photograph showing her body after she jumped from an observation platform of the Empire State Building
 Tom McHale (1983), American novelist
 Chris McKinstry (2006), Canadian artificial intelligence researcher
 Kenny McKinley (2010), American football player, gunshot
 Robert McLane (1904), American politician, mayor of Baltimore, gunshot
 John B. McLemore (2015), American horologist and subject of the podcast S-Town, ingested potassium cyanide
 Maggie McNamara (1978), American actress, drug overdose
 Ronnie McNutt (2020), American war veteran, single-shot rifle
 Alexander McQueen (2010), British fashion designer and couturier, hanging
 Charles B. McVay III (1968), American naval officer, captain of the USS Indianapolis, gunshot to the head
 Joe Meek (1967), English record producer, gunshot
 Megabocchus (53 BC), Roman cavalryman and friend of Publius Licinius Crassus
 Megan Meier (2006), American high school student and victim of bullying, hanging
 Ulrike Meinhof (1976), German RAF terrorist, hanging
 David Meirhofer (1974), American serial killer, hanging
 Kitty Melrose (1912), English stage actress and singer, carbon monoxide poisoning
 Adolf Merckle (2009), German entrepreneur and billionaire, train
 Lucius Cornelius Merula (87 BC), Roman politician, consul and high priest, cut his veins
 Jill Messick (2018), American film producer
 Charlotte Mew (1928), English poet, Lysol poisoning.
 Katie Meyer (2022), US soccer player
 Maningning Miclat (2000), Filipino poet and painter, jumped from the seventh floor of a building
 Flávio Migliaccio (2020), Brazilian actor, film director and screenwriter, hanging
 Walter M. Miller Jr. (1996), American writer, gunshot
 Mary Millington (1979), English model and softcore pornographic actress, overdose of clomipramine, paracetamol and alcohol
 Minamoto no Yorimasa (1180), Japanese poet, general and politician, ritual seppuku disembowelment
 Mingsioi (1866), Chinese general, explosion
 Miroslava (1955), Czech-born Mexican actress, overdose of sleeping pills
 Dave Mirra (2016), American BMX rider who later competed in rallycross racing, gunshot
 Yukio Mishima (1970), Japanese author, poet, playwright, film director and activist, ritual seppuku disembowelment
 Tyrone Mitchell (1984), American murderer, gunshot
 Mithridates VI (63 BC), King of Pontus, ordered an officer to stab him
Haruma Miura (2020), Japanese actor, hanging
 Shizuka Miura (2010), Japanese doll maker and musician, possibly related to medication
 Mkwawa (1898), Hehe tribal leader, gunshot to the head
 George de Mohrenschildt (1977), American petroleum geologist, CIA informant, friend of Lee Harvey Oswald and key witness for the Warren Commission, gunshot
 Molon (220 BC), Seleucid satrap of Media
 Antonin Moine (1849), French sculptor, gunshot
 Mario Monicelli (2010), Italian film director, jumped out of a hospital window
 Marilyn Monroe (1962), American film actress, barbiturate overdose
 Haoui Montaug (1991), American nightclub doorman and cabaret promoter, secobarbital overdose
 Henry de Montherlant (1972), French writer, gunshot in the throat
 Donnie Moore (1989), American baseball player, gunshot after shooting his wife
 Ronald Lee Moore (2008), American fugitive and suspected serial killer, hanging
 Masakatsu Morita (1970), Japanese political activist, stabbing per ritural seppuku disembowelment
 A. R. Morlan (2016), American author
Gray Morrow (2001), American comics artist and illustrator, gunshot
Max Mosley (2021), British former FIA president, gunshot after learning of terminal illness
 Jason Moss (2006), American attorney and author of The Last Victim, gunshot
 Miljan Mrdaković (2020), Serbian footballer, gunshot
 Uwe Mundlos (2011), German National Socialist Underground terrorist, gunshot
 Ona Munson (1955), American actress, barbiturate overdose
 David Munrow (1976) English music historian, hanging
 Ian Murdock (2015), American software engineer and founder of the Debian distribution of the GNU/Linux operating system, hanging
 Francine Mussey (1933), French actress, ingestion of poison

N

 Chūichi Nagumo (1944), Japanese admiral, gunshot
 Mirosław Nahacz (2007), Polish novelist and screenwriter, hanging
 Seigō Nakano (1943), Japanese fascist political leader and journalist, disembowelment
 Vladimir Nalivkin (1918), Russian scientist, politician, diplomat
Azade Namdari (2021), Iranian television host
 Scott Nearing (1983), American political activist and conservationist, by self-starvation
Milan Nedić (1946), Serbian general, politician and prime minister of the Government of National Salvation, jumping out of a Belgrade prison window
 Nekojiru (1998), Japanese manga artist, hanging
 Nero (68 AD), Roman emperor, ordered his secretary to kill him
 Marcus Cocceius Nerva (33 AD), Roman jurist, official and confidant of Tiberius, starvation
Klara Dan von Neumann (1963), Hungarian-American computer programmer, drowning
 Terry Newton (2010), English rugby league player, hanging
 Tom Nicon (2010), French model, jumped out of apartment window
 Bruno Niedziela (1962), American football player
 Frank Nitti (1943), American gangster in charge of Al Capone's strong-arm and "muscle" operations, and later the front-man for Capone's crime syndicate, gunshot to the head
 Karl Nobiling (1878), German academic, who made an assassination attempt on the German emperor Wilhelm I, gunshot to the head
 Jon Nödtveidt (2006), Swedish guitarist for the black metal band Dissection, gunshot
 Iván Noel (2021), French-Argentine film director and producer
 Bill Nojay (2016), American politician and member of the New York State Assembly, gunshot
 Mita Noor (2013), Bangladeshi actress, hanging
 Franz Nopcsa (1933), Hungarian aristocrat, adventurer, scholar, geologist, paleontologist and albanologist, gunshot after killing companion Bajazid Doda
 Christine Norman, (1930), American stage actress, jump from building
 John Norton-Griffiths, (1930), British engineer and politician, gunshot to head
 Hisashi Nozawa (2004), Japanese writer, hanging

O

John O'Brien (1994), American novelist, best known for his novel, Leaving Las Vegas, gunshot to the head
Sean O'Haire (2014), American former WWE wrestler and MMA fighter, hanging
 Phil Ochs (1976), American singer-songwriter, hanging
 Oda Nobunaga (1582), Japanese daimyō and general, ritual seppuku disembowelment
 Ogawa Kiyoshi (1945), Japanese kamikaze pilot
 Aleksandr Dmitrievich Ogorodnik (1977), Soviet diplomat and spy for the CIA, cyanide capsule
 Per "Dead" Ohlin (1991), Swedish vocalist for the Norwegian black metal band Mayhem, gunshot to the head
 Yukiko Okada (1986), Japanese singer, jumped out of window
 Lembit Oll (1999), Estonian chess Grandmaster, jumped out of window
 Ambrose Olsen (2010), American model, hanging
 Sergo Ordzhonikidze (1937), Soviet Bolshevik leader, member of the CPSU Politburo, the head of the Supreme Soviet of the National Economy and close associate of Joseph Stalin, gunshot
 Otho (69 AD), Roman Emperor, stabbed himself
 Othryades (546 BC), Spartan hoplite, sole survivor of the Battle of the 300 Champions
 Ōuchi Yoshitaka (1551), Japanese daimyō and general, ritual seppuku disembowelment

P

 Stephen Paddock (2017), American perpetrator of the 2017 Las Vegas shooting, gunshot
 Caecina Paetus (42 AD), Roman alleged conspirator against Emperor Claudius, stabbed himself
 Tommy Page (2017), American singer songwriter
 Ali-Reza Pahlavi (2011), son of Mohammad Reza Pahlavi, last Shah of Iran, gunshot
 Leila Pahlavi (2001), daughter of Mohammad Reza Pahlavi, last Shah of Iran, overdose of sleeping pills
 Jan Palach (1969), Czech student, self-immolation
 Mico Palanca (2019) Filipino actor, jump from building
 Brodie Panlock (2006), Australian bullying victim, jumped from the top of a multilevel carpark in Hawthorn
 Pantites (c. 470s BC), Spartan warrior and one of the 300 Spartans sent to the Battle of Thermopylae, hanging
 Park Yong-ha (2010), South Korean actor and singer, hanging
 Park Won-soon (2020), South Korean activist, lawyer and Mayor of Seoul
 Violeta Parra (1967), Chilean composer, songwriter, folklorist, ethno-musicologist and visual artist, gunshot
 Rehtaeh Parsons (2013), Canadian high school student who was bullied at school and online after images of her alleged gang rape were distributed online by its perpetrators, hanging
 Christine Pascal (1996), French actress, writer and director, jumped out of window
 Dušan Pašek (1998), Slovak ice hockey player, gunshot
 Darrin Patrick (2020), American author and pastor, gunshot
 Mark Pavelich (2021), American hockey player, asphyxia
 Cesare Pavese (1950), Italian author, overdose of barbiturates
 Pina Pellicer (1964), Mexican actress, overdose of sleeping pills
 Peregrinus Proteus (165 AD), Greek early Christian convert and later Cynic philosopher from Mysia, immolated himself on a funeral pyre during the Olympic Games
 Oscar Glaze Peters (1894), American businessman
 Jeret "Speedy" Peterson (2011), American skier, Olympic medalist, gunshot
 Marcus Petreius (46 BC), Roman politician and general, double-suicide by sword with Juba I of Numidia
 Petronius (66 AD), Roman senator, consul, courtier and novelist, opening his veins
 Max Joseph von Pettenkofer (1901), German chemist and hygienist
 Phasael (40 BC), prince from the Herodian Dynasty of Judea and governor of Jerusalem, hit his head against a great stone
 Phila (287 BC), Macedonian noblewoman, daughter and adviser of Antipater, poison
 Philistus (356 BC), Greek historian and naval commander
 Justin Pierce (2000), English-born American actor and skateboarder known for his role in the 1995 drama Kids, hanging
 Rosamond Pinchot (1938), American actress and socialite, carbon monoxide poisoning
 H. Beam Piper (1964), American science fiction author, gunshot
 Gaius Calpurnius Piso (65 AD), Roman senator, orator, advocate and leading member of the Pisonian conspiracy, slit his wrists
 Gnaeus Calpurnius Piso (20 AD), Roman statesman and consul, cut his throat
 Luigi Pistilli (1996), Italian actor, hanging
 Alejandra Pizarnik (1972), Argentine poet, secobarbital overdose
 Sylvia Plath (1963), American poet, novelist, children's author, gassing herself in her kitchen
 Dana Plato (1999), American child actress, notable for the TV series Diff'rent Strokes, overdose of carisoprodol and hydrocodone Plato's son, Tyler Lambert, killed himself on May 6, 2010, almost 11 years to the day after her death, via gunshot wound to the head
 Edward Platt (1974), American actor, notable for his role on the TV series Get Smart
 E. O. Plauen (1944), German cartoonist, hanging with a towel
 Michael Player (1986), American serial killer, gunshot
 Daniel Pollock (1992), Australian actor, walked in front of moving train
 Gnaeus Pompeius Longinus (105 AD), Roman senator and general, swallowing poison
 Porcia (42 BC), Roman noblewoman, wife of Marcus Junius Brutus, swallowing burning coal or carbon monoxide poisoning
 C.W. Post (1914), American inventor, and pioneer in the manufacturing of prepared foods, in particular breakfast cereal, gunshot
 Poenius Postumus (61 AD), Roman praefectus castrorum of the Legion II Augusta, fell upon his sword
 Randy Potter (2017), American former missing person, gunshot
 Jan Potocki (1815), Polish nobleman, gunshot
 James Edward Pough (1990), American spree killer, gunshot
 Hayden Poulter (2018), New Zealand serial killer
 Josh Powell (2012), American main suspect in the disappearance of his wife, Susan, blew up his house with him and his children inside
 Slobodan Praljak (2017), Bosnian Croat director, general and war criminal, potassium cyanide
 George R. Price (1975), American scientist, cutting an artery
 Phoebe Prince (2010), American high school student who was bullied at school and online, hanging
 Ptolemy (309 BC), Macedonian general, hemlock poisoning
 Ptolemy of Cyprus (58 BC), King of Cyprus and member of the Ptolemaic dynasty, poison
 Boris Pugo (1991), Soviet politician, gunshot
 Kushal Punjabi (2019), Indian actor, hanging

Q

 Qiao Renliang (2016), Chinese singer and actor, slit wrist
 Qu Yuan (278 BC), Chinese poet and minister, drowning
 Henry Quastler (1963), Austrian physician and radiologist, overdosed on pills
 Antero de Quental, (1891) Portuguese writer and poet, gunshot.
 Quintillus (270 AD), Roman emperor, opening his veins
 Horacio Quiroga (1937), Uruguayan playwright, poet, and short story writer, drank a glass of cyanide

R

 Władysław Raginis (1939), Polish military commander, grenade
 Otto Rahn (1939), German medievalist, Ariosophist and Obersturmführer of the Schutzstaffel, freezing
 Jason Raize (2004), American actor, singer and former Goodwill Ambassador for the United Nations Environment Programme, hanging
 Sushant Singh Rajput (2020), Indian actor, hanging
 František Rajtoral (2017), Czech soccer player, hanging
 Anil Ramdas (2012), Dutch writer and journalist, method undisclosed
 Kodela Siva Prasada Rao (2019), Indian politician, hanging
 Nicola Ann Raphael (2001), Scottish bullied student, overdose of dextropropoxyphene
 David Rappaport (1990), English actor, known for the film Time Bandits, gunshot
 Jan-Carl Raspe (1977), German RAF terrorist, gunshot
 Terry Ratzmann (2005), American mass murderer, gunshot
 Geli Raubal (1931), niece of Adolf Hitler, gunshot
 Margaret Mary Ray (1998), American stalker, hit by a train
 Roy Raymond (1993), American founder of Victoria's Secret, jumped off the Golden Gate Bridge
 Albert Razin (2019), Russian Udmurt language rights activist and sociologist, self-immolation
 Reckful (2020), Israeli-American Twitch streamer and Esports player
 Liam Rector (2007), American poet and educator, gunshot
 Wilhelm Rediess (1945), Nazi SS and Police Leader in Norway, gunshot
 Ernst Reicher (1936), German actor, screenwriter, film producer and film director, hanging
 David Reimer (2004), Canadian man who after a botched circumcision in infancy, was unsuccessfully reassigned as a girl until he learned the truth at age 13, gunshot
 The Renegade (1999), American professional wrestler, gunshot
 Angelo Reyes (2011), Chief of Staff of the Armed Forces of the Philippines, gunshot
Thomas C. Reynolds (1887), Confederate governor of Missouri, jump from the third floor into the freight elevator shaft of the Custom House in St. Louis
 John Rheinecker (2017) American Major League Baseball pitcher, hanging
 Rikyū (1591), Japanese tea master and confidant of Toyotomi Hideyoshi, ritual seppuku disembowelment
 Artūras Rimkevičius (2019), Lithuanian footballer, gunshot
 Al Rio (2012), Brazilian comics artist, and animation director, hanging
 Adele Ritchie, (1930) American actress, gunshot to the throat
 Peter Robbins (2022), American voice actor, voice of Charlie Brown
 Dale Roberts (2010), English footballer, hanging
 Rachel Roberts (1980), Welsh actress, barbiturate and alcohol overdose and consumption of lye or alkali
 Charles Rocket (2005), American actor, cut throat
 Jamey Rodemeyer (2011), American bullied blogger and high school student, hanging
 Elliot Rodger (2014), American spree killer who perpetrated the 2014 Isla Vista killings, gunshot to the head
 Robert Neal Rodriguez (1992), American serial killer, cyanide poisoning
 Roh Moo-hyun (2009), ninth President of the Republic of Korea, jump from a cliff
 Erwin Rommel (1944), German general and military theorist, cyanide poisoning
 Jodon F. Romero (2012), American criminal whose suicide was broadcast on national television following a car chase in Arizona, gunshot
 Edgar Rosenberg (1987), American film and television producer and husband of Joan Rivers, diazepam overdose
 Frank Rosolino (1978), American jazz trombonist, shot himself after killing one son and blinding the other
 Mark Rothko (1970), American abstract expressionist painter, slit his arms
 Conrad Roy (2014), American marine salvage captain, carbon monoxide poisoning, after his girlfriend urged him to commit suicide, for which she was convicted of involuntary manslaughter
 Ruan Lingyu (1935), Chinese actress, barbiturate overdose
 Ernst Rückert (1945), German actor, hanging
 Rudolf, Crown Prince of Austria (1889), son of Emperor Franz Joseph I, gunshot during the Mayerling incident
 Lori Erica Ruff (2010), American formerly unidentified identity thief, gunshot
 Edmund Ruffin (1865), American author, agriculturalist, agronomist and secessionist, gunshot to the head
 Quintus Corellius Rufus (before 113 AD), Roman senator, consul, confidant and teacher of Pliny the Younger, refusing food and treatment for his illnesses
 Michael Ruppert (2014), American political activist, gunshot
 Richard Russell (2018), American airport ground operator and airplane thief, intentionally crashing the stolen airplane
 Stevie Ryan (2017), American actress and comedian, hanging
 Rick Rypien (2011), Canadian professional ice hockey player

S

 Mário de Sá-Carneiro (1916), Portuguese poet and short story writer
 Jun Sadogawa (2013), Japanese manga artist, hanging
 El Hedi ben Salem (1977), Moroccan actor, hanging
 Mark Salling (2018), American actor, hanging
 Johanna Sällström (2007), Swedish actress
 Alexander Samsonov (1914), Russian cavalry officer and general, gunshot
 George Sanders (1972), Russian-born English actor, singer, composer and author, overdose
 Sanmao (1991), Taiwanese writer and translator, hanged with silk stockings
 Mónica Santa María (1994), Peruvian model and TV presenter, gunshot
 Nick Santino (2012), American soap opera actor, overdosed on pills
Alberto Santos-Dumont (1932), Brazilian aviation pioneer, hanging
 Vytautas Šapranauskas (2013), Lithuanian actor, hanging
 Carl Sargeant (2017), Welsh politician and former member of the Welsh Government, hanging
 Sam Sarpong (2015), British-born American model and actor, jump from a bridge
 Satanta (1878), Kiowa war chief, jump out a window
 Drake Sather (2004), American screenwriter, gunshot
 Jiro Sato (1934), Japanese tennis player, drowning
 Saul (1012 BC), Jewish king, pierced himself with his sword
 Savannah (1994), American adult film actress, gunshot to the head
 Marcus Ostorius Scapula (65 AD), Roman senator, consul and military tribune, severed his veins and stabbed himself with help from a slave
 Mamercus Aemilius Scaurus (34 AD), Roman rhetorician, poet, senator and consul
 Thomas Schäfer (2020), German politician, jumped in front of a train
 Aleko Schinas (1913), Greek assassin of King George I of Greece, jumped out of a Thessaloniki police station window
 Sybille Schmitz (1955), German actress, overdose of sleeping pills
 Robert Schommer (2001), American astronomer
 Conrad Schumann (1998), German Democratic Republic soldier who famously defected to West Germany during the construction of the Berlin Wall, hanging
 Tom Schweich (2015), American politician, gunshot
 Metellus Scipio (46 BC), Roman consul and military commander, stabbed himself
 L'Wren Scott (2014), American fashion designer, hanging
 Tony Scott (2012), English film director of films such as Top Gun, jumped off the Vincent Thomas Bridge in Los Angeles
 Junior Seau (2012), American football All-Pro player, gunshot to the chest
 Jean Seberg (1979), American actress, barbiturate overdose
 Sonia Sekula (1963), Swiss painter, hanging
 Seneca the Younger (65 AD), Roman philosopher, cut his veins
Arma Senkrah (1900), American violinist, gunshot
 Rezső Seress (1968), Hungarian pianist and composer, choked himself with a wire
 Marcus Sedatius Severianus (161 or 162), Roman senator, consul and general, starved himself
 Mamercus Aemilius Scaurus (34 AD), Roman senator, followed by his wife Sextia
 Anne Sexton (1974), American poet, carbon monoxide poisoning
 Frances Ford Seymour (1950), Canadian-American socialite, cut her throat
 Oksana Shachko (2018), Ukrainian artist and activist, cofounder of FEMEN, hanging
 Shah Begum (1604), first wife of Emperor Jahangir, opium overdose
 Shahrzad (1937), Iranian dramatist and playwright
 Shamash-shum-ukin (648 BC), King of Babylon, self-immolation
 Del Shannon (1990), American musician, gunshot
 Samir Sharma (2020), Indian actor, hanging
 H. James Shea Jr. (1970), American politician, gunshot
 Alice Bradley Sheldon (James Tiptree, Jr.) (1987), American writer, gunshot
 Harold Shipman (2004), English family doctor and serial killer, hanging
 Shoba (1980), Indian actress, hanging
 Manuel Fernández Silvestre (1921), Spanish general, gunshot
 Tiffany Simelane (2009), Swazi beauty queen, ingestion of weevil tablet
 Per Sivle (1904), Norwegian poet and novelist, gunshot
 Mykola Skrypnyk (1933), Ukrainian Bolshevik leader, gunshot
 Austra Skujiņa (1932) Latvian poet, jump from a bridge.
 Irina Slavina (2020), Russian journalist, self-immolation
 Walter Slezak (1983), Austrian actor, gunshot
 Everett Sloane (1965), American actor, drug overdose
 Austin J. Small (1929), British popular writer "Seamark", gas inhalation
 Smiley Culture (2011), English reggae singer and DJ, stabbing
 James Vinton Smith (1952), Australian politician, gunshot
 Someshvara I (1068), King of Western Chalukya, drowning in the Tungabhadra river
 David Sonboly (2016), Iranian-German perpetrator of the 2016 Munich shooting, gunshot
 Sophonisba (after 203 BC), Carthaginian noblewoman, swallowing poison
 Peu Sousa (2013), Brazilian guitarist for Nove Mil Anjos and Pitty, hanging
 Barea Soranus (66 AD), Roman consul, senator and governor of Asia
 Kate Spade (2018), American fashion designer, hanging
 Gary Speed (2011), Welsh footballer and manager, hanging
 Mark Speight (2008), English television presenter, hanging
 Sporus (69 AD), Roman boy whom the emperor Nero had castrated and married, stabbed his throat with a dagger
 Andrew Joseph Stack III (2010), American embedded software consultant, plane crash
 Nicolas de Staël (1955), French painter, leapt from his eleventh story studio terrace
 Frank Stanford (1978), American poet, gunshot
 Scott Stearney (2018), United States Navy admiral, gunshot
Costică Ștefănescu (2013), Romanian footballer and manager, jump from the fifth floor of the Military Hospital in Bucharest
 Jean Stein (2017), American author, jump from a New York City high rise
 Steve Stephens (2017), American vocational specialist and murder suspect, gunshot after police pursuit
 Jon Paul Steuer (2018), American actor and musician, known as the first actor to play the Star Trek character Alexander Rozhenko, gunshot
 Brody Stevens (2019), American stand-up comedian and actor, hanging
 Inger Stevens (1970), Swedish-American actress, barbiturate overdose
 John Stevens (1923), English cricketer, jumped in front of moving train
 Lyle Stevik (2001), formerly unidentified man using the alias name taken from a book by Joyce Carol Oates, hanging
 Gary Stewart (2003), American country music singer, gunshot to the neck
 Jay Stewart (1989), American television and radio announcer, gunshot
 Adalbert Stifter (1868), Austrian writer, cut neck with a razor
 Pringle Stokes (1828), British naval officer and captain of  during her first voyage, gunshot
 Alfonsina Storni (1938), Argentine poet, drowning
 David Stove (1994), Australian philosopher, hanging
 Otto Strandman (1941), Estonian politician, gunshot
 Mel Street (1978), American country singer, gunshot
 Ludwig Stumpfegger (1945), German doctor and Adolf Hitler's personal surgeon, cyanide poisoning
 Sue Harukata (1555), daimyo of Ouchi clan, disembowelment
 Sungdare Sherpa (1989), Nepalese Sherpa mountaineer
 Sulli (2019), South Korean actress, singer, and model, hanging
 Roy Sullivan (1983), American park ranger known for being struck by lightning seven times, gunshot
 David Edward Sutch (1999), English musician also known as Screaming Lord Sutch, hanging
 Adam Svoboda (2019), Czech ice hockey goaltender and coach, hanging
 Aaron Swartz (2013), American computer programmer, writer, political organizer and activist, hanging
Sawyer Sweeten (2015), American former child actor (Everybody Loves Raymond), gunshot

T

 Sinedu Tadesse (1995), Ethiopian murderer, hanging
Jahangir Tafazzoli (1990), Iranian journalist and politician
 Taira no Tokiko (1185), Japanese Buddhist nun, wife of the chief of the Taira, grandmother of Emperor Antoku, drowning
 Taira no Tomomori (1185), Japanese general, admiral and heir apparent of the Taira, drowning
 Yūko Takeuchi (2020), Japanese actress, hanging
 Yutaka Taniyama (1958), Japanese mathematician
 Jacque Alexander Tardy (1827), Scottish-French pirate, slit his own throat
 Jean Tatlock (1944), American physician, psychiatrist, communist activist, mistress of Robert Oppenheimer, drowning in a bathtub
 Victor Tausk (1919), Austrian psychoanalyst and neurologist, gunshot and hanging
 Wayne Kent Taylor (2021), American entrepreneur and founder of Texas Roadhouse
 Pál Teleki (1941), Prime Minister of the Kingdom of Hungary, gunshot
 Lou Tellegen (1934), Dutch actor, director and screenwriter, stabbed himself in the chest with a pair of scissors
 Seth Teller (2014), MIT computer science professor, blunt trauma to head and torso
 Stella Tennant (2020) British model
 Josef Terboven (1945), Nazi Reichskommissar for Norway, detonating 50 kg of dynamite
 Tewodros II (1868), Emperor of Ethiopia, gunshot
 Tezozomoctli (1430), Emperor of Cuauhtitlan, poison
 Mike Thalassitis (2019), English-Cypriot footballer and television personality, hanging
 Jack Thayer (1945), Titanic survivor, cut his wrists
 Samuel J. F. Thayer (1893), American architect, gunshot
 Thích Quảng Đức (1963), Vietnamese Mahayana Buddhist monk, self-immolation
 Hugo Thimig (1944), Austrian actor, overdose of Barbital
 Nicky Thomas (1990), Jamaican reggae singer
 Hunter S. Thompson (2005), gonzo journalist, author of Fear and Loathing in Las Vegas, gunshot
 Terry Thompson (2011), zookeeper and owner of Muskingum County Animal Farm, gunshot
 William Thornton (1840), British lieutenant-general
 Ofonius Tigellinus (69 AD), Roman prefect of the Praetorian Guard, cut his throat with a razor
 Carlos Tobalina (1989), Peruvian-born pornographic filmmaker and actor, gunshot
 Li Tobler (1975), Swiss actress, model and life partner of artist H. R. Giger, gunshot
 Amanda Todd (2012), Canadian high school student who was bullied at school and online, hanging
 Ernst Toller (1939), German playwright, socialist revolutionary and politician, hanging
 Ivo-Valentino Tomaš (2019), Croatian football player
 Radka Toneff (1982), Norwegian jazz singer, overdose of sleeping pills
 John Kennedy Toole (1969), American novelist known for A Confederacy of Dunces, carbon monoxide poisoning
 Dudu Topaz (2009), Israeli TV personality and entertainer, hanging while incarcerated in jail
 Maury Travis (2002), American serial killer, hanging
 Silvanus Trevail (1903), English architect, gunshot
 Dick Trickle (2013), American NASCAR driver, gunshot
 Sunil Tripathi (2013), American student and former suspect in the Boston Marathon bombing
 Verne Troyer (2018), American actor known for his role as Mini-Me in the Austin Powers films, alcohol intoxication
 Tron (1998), German hacker, hanging
 Butch Trucks (2017), American drummer for the Allman Brothers Band, gunshot
 Yordan Tsitsonkov (1926), Macedonian Bulgarian assassin, hanged himself
 Kōkichi Tsuburaya (1968), Japanese marathoner, cut his wrists
 Marina Tsvetaeva (1941), Russian poet, hanging
 Kurt Tucholsky (1935), German journalist, satirist and writer, overdose of sleeping pills
 Alan Turing (1954), English mathematician, logician, cryptanalyst and computer scientist, eating an apple laced with cyanide
 Jim Tyrer (1980), American football player, gunshot

U

 Ernst Udet (1941), German pilot and air force general, gunshot to the head
 Miyu Uehara (2011), Japanese model, hanging
 Ugaki Matome (1945), Japanese admiral, diarist and the last kamikaze pilot, unsuccessfully attempted a kamikaze attack after Japan already surrendered, likely crashing into the sea
 Jack Unterweger (1994), Austrian serial killer, hanging
 Andrew Urdiales (2018), American serial killer
 Mitsuru Ushijima (1945), Japanese general, began to commit ritual seppuku disembowelment just before one of his adjutants decapitated him with a saber

V

 Dimitris Vakrinos (1997), Greek serial killer and robber, hanging
 Edwin Valero (2010), Venezuelan boxer, hanging
 Kelly Jean Van Dyke (1991), American adult film actress, hanging
 Vincent van Gogh (1890), Dutch Post-Impressionist painter, gunshot
 George Washington Vanderbilt III (1961), American explorer and member of the Vanderbilt family, jumped from the 10th floor of the Mark Hopkins Hotel
 Johannes Vares (1946), Estonian poet, doctor and politician, gunshot
 Getúlio Vargas (1954), two-time President of Brazil, gunshot
 Publius Quinctilius Varus (9 AD), Roman general, fell upon his sword
 Minnie Vautrin (1940), American missionary in China, stove gas inhalation
 Lupe Vélez (1944), Mexican actress, overdose of secobarbital
 Dominique Venner (2013), French author, gunshot to the head in the Notre Dame de Paris
 Marcus Julius Vestinus Atticus (65 AD), Roman senator and consul, opening his veins
 Titus Vettius (104 BC), Roman equestrian and leader of a slave revolt
 Lucius Antistius Vetus (65 AD), Roman senator, consul and governor of Germania Superior
 Juhan Viiding (1995), Estonian poet and actor, cut his veins
 Hervé Villechaize (1993), French actor known for his work on the television series Fantasy Island, gunshot
 Pierre-Charles Villeneuve (1806), French admiral, stabbing
 Norah Vincent (2022), American journalist and novelist, assisted suicide 
 Lucius Annius Vinicianus (42 AD), Roman senator, plotter of the assassination of Caligula, rebel against Claudius
 Frank Vitkovic (1987), Australian spree killer who perpetrated the Queen Street massacre in Melbourne, jumped from a window
 Ned Vizzini (2013), American author of young adult fiction such as the novel It's Kind of a Funny Story, leapt from a building
 Zinaida Volkova (1933), daughter of Leon Trotsky, gas asphyxiation
 Chris Von Erich (1991), professional wrestler, gunshot to the head
 Kerry Von Erich (1993), professional wrestler, gunshot to the chest
 Mike Von Erich (1987), professional wrestler, overdose of Placidyl and alcohol
 Bulelani Vukwana (2002), South African spree killer, gunshot

W

 Bradford Thomas Wagner (2005), American real estate agent, gay pornographic film actor and suspected serial rapist, hanging himself with a bed sheet
 Gustav Wagner (1980), Austrian SS-Oberscharführer and deputy commander of Sobibor extermination camp, knife wound
 David Wallace (1904), father of United States First Lady Bess Truman, gunshot to the head
 David Foster Wallace (2008), American author, hanging
 Stephen Ward (1963), English osteopathic physician and one of the central figures in the 1963 Profumo affair, overdose of sleeping pills
 John William Warde (1938), American bank clerk known for spending 14 hours on a ledge before jumping from the 17th floor of Manhattan's Gotham Hotel
 Ed Warren (1963), American actor, politician and former mayor of Cheyenne, Wyoming, carbon monoxide poisoning
 Nick Wasicsko (1993), former Mayor of Yonkers, New York (1987–89), gunshot to the head
 Andre Waters (2006), former NFL safety, gunshot to the head
 Gary Webb (2004), American investigative reporter, gunshot to the head
Jaromir Weinberger (1967), Czech/American composer, lethal overdose of sedative
 Otto Weininger (1903), Austrian philosopher, gunshot
 Jeff Weise (2005), American high school student who perpetrated the Red Lake shootings, gunshot
 Dorrit Weixler (1916), German film actress, hanging
 Bob Welch (2012), American rock singer-songwriter and former member of Fleetwood Mac, gunshot to the chest
 Horace Wells (1848), American dentist and pioneer of anaesthesiology, slitting his left femoral artery with a razor
 Vince Welnick (2006), American singer-songwriter and keyboardist for The Tubes, slit throat
 Dawn-Marie Wesley (2000), Canadian bullied high school student, hanging
 Fred West (1995), English serial killer, hanging
 Assia Wevill (1969), German-born lover of English poet Ted Hughes, murder–suicide of her daughter with Hughes, gas
 James Whale (1957), English director, drowning
 Dan White (1985), San Francisco politician who assassinated Mayor George Moscone and Harvey Milk, carbon monoxide poisoning
 Kurt-Werner Wichmann (1993), German suspected serial killer and main suspect in the Göhrde murders, hanging
 Robin Williams (2014), American comedian and actor, hanging
 Rozz Williams (1998), American musician, lead vocalist for Christian Death, hanging
 Wendy O. Williams (1998), American singer-songwriter for the Plasmatics, gunshot
 Tom Wills (1880), Australian cricketer and pioneer of Australian rules football, stabbed himself in the heart with a pair of scissors
 Jarrid Wilson (2019), American pastor and author
 Christopher Wilmarth (1987), American sculptor, hanging
Sheree Winton (1976), English actress, barbiturate overdose
 Jack Wishna (2012), president and CEO of CPAmerica, carbon monoxide poisoning
 Frank Wolff (1971), American actor, slashed his throat
 Jiverly Antares Wong (2009), naturalized American citizen from Vietnam who perpetrated the Binghamton shooting, gunshot
 Tobi Wong (2010), Canadian born designer, and conceptual artist, overdosed on pills
 Bum-kon Woo (1982), South Korean policeman and spree killer
 Seung-yeon Woo (2009), South Korean actress and model, hanging
 Wally Wood (1981), American comic book writer and artist, gunshot
 Francesca Woodman (1981), American photographer, jumped from a window
 Virginia Woolf (1941), English author, essayist, and publisher, drowning
 Stephen Wooldridge (2017), Australian cyclist
Tera Wray (2016), American pornographic actress
Marcin Wrona (2015), Polish film director, hanging
 Wu Zixu (484 BC), Chinese general and politician of the Wu, stabbed himself with a sword

Y

 Yakushiji Motoichi (1504), Japanese samurai and deputy governor, ritual seppuku disembowelment
 Yamaguchi Otoya (1960), Japanese nationalist who assassinated Asanuma Inejirō, hanging
 Yang Yang (2019), Chinese tenor, jump from the 26th floor of his apartment building
 Yasmine (2009), Belgian singer, hanging
 Seizō Yasunori (1945), Japanese kamikaze pilot, flew his plane into the USS Bunker Hill
 Kelly Yeomans (1997), English bullied high school student, dextropropoxyphene overdose
 Sergei Yesenin (1925), Russian and Soviet poet, hanging
 Francis Parker Yockey (1960), American neo-Fascist political philosopher and polemicist also known under his pen name Ulick Varange, cyanide poisoning
 Yoñlu (2006), Brazilian singer-songwriter, carbon monoxide poisoning
Yoon Ki-won (2011), South Korean football goalkeeper, charcoal-burning suicide
 Atsumi Yoshikubo (2014), Japanese psychiatrist, intentionally getting lost in the Canadian Taiga
 Gūwalgiya Youlan (1921), Manchu noblewoman, primary consort of Zaifeng, Prince Chun and mother of China's last emperor Puyi, opium overdose
 Cy Young (1964), Chinese-American animator, barbiturate overdose
 Faron Young (1996), American country music singer, gunshot
 Gig Young (1978), American actor, gunshot after fatally shooting his wife
 Lee Thompson Young (2013), American actor, gunshot
 Fakhra Younus (2012), Pakistani dancer, jumped from building

Z

 Bill Zeller (2011), American computer programmer and developer of myTunes, oxygen deprivation due to hanging led to brain damage, taken off life support
 Hai Zi (1989), Chinese poet, lying down on railroad tracks
 Marion Zioncheck (1936), American congressman from Washington's 1st district, jumped from his office window
 Joost Zwagerman (2015), Dutch writer, poet, and essayist
 Stefan Zweig (1942), Austrian novelist, playwright, journalist and biographer, barbiturate overdose

Possible or disputed suicides

 Clodius Albinus (197), Roman emperor, killed himself after a defeat in battle (possibly executed by Septimius Severus)
 Prince Alfred of Edinburgh (1899), member of the British Royal Family. The exact circumstances of Alfred's death are unknown, and varying accounts have been published. His sister Marie's memoirs simply say his health "broke down", and other writers have said that he had "consumption". The Times published an account stating he had died of a tumor, while the Complete Peerage gives the generally accepted account that he "shot himself".
 Gameel Al-Batouti (1999), Egyptian pilot of EgyptAir and former officer of the Egyptian Air Force who was killed in the crash of EgyptAir Flight 990. It is disputed on whether or not it was caused by mechanical malfunction or by Al-Batouti in a suicide by pilot
 Scotty Beckett (1968), American actor, an overdose of either barbiturates or alcohol, after seeking medical attention for blunt force trauma injuries following a severe beating
 Wade Belak (2011), Canadian ice hockey player. Belak was found dead in his home in Toronto, and the police investigated his death as a suicide. Later, hockey analyst and former player P.J. Stock alleged that Belak's death was not a suicide, but accidental. Although Stock later stepped back from his comments, members of Belak's family also believe his death was accidental.
 Edward Brittain (1918), British army captain, gunshot by enemy sniper, to whom Brittain may have deliberately exposed himself, to avoid a court-martial for homosexuality
 Terry A. Davis (2018), American programmer and creator of TempleOS, struck by a train
 Jeffrey Epstein (2019), American financier and convicted sex offender, hanging Whether Epstein's death was suicide or homicide is a point of controversy.
 John Fitch (1798), American inventor, opium overdose
 James Forrestal (1949), First U.S. Secretary of Defense, Secretary of the Navy, fell from 16th floor of building (disputed suicide)
 Rick Genest (2018), performance artist, actor and model, fall from a balcony 
 Kurt Gödel (1978), Austrian-American logician, mathematician and philosopher, died of starvation as a result of refusing to eat anything not prepared by his wife, who was hospitalized, out of fear of being poisoned. It is unclear whether this was a suicide.
 Nigel Green (1972), English actor, overdose of sleeping pills 
 Hannibal (183–181 BC), Carthaginian military commander and tactician, possibly poison 
 Sung-jae Kim (1995), South Korean singer and former member of Deux, stabbed in the arm 28 times with a syringe containing animal anesthetic. It is unknown if it was a murder or suicide.
 David Koresh (1993), American leader of the Branch Davidians, gunshot. It is unknown if he was murdered by one of the Branch Davidians, or if he died by suicide.
 Jules Lequier (1862), French philosopher, likely swam voluntarily out into the ocean
 Primo Levi (1987), Italian chemist, writer and Holocaust survivor, jumped from his third-story apartment
 Meriwether Lewis (1809), U.S. explorer and partner of William Clark, gunshot. There is some debate as to whether his death was a suicide
 Lucretius (c. 55 BC), Roman poet and Epicurean philosopher. The only source of his suicide is Jerome, who is considered by scholars as unreliable and hostile towards Lucretius
 Kizito Mihigo (2020), Rwandan gospel singer, genocide survivor and peace activist, hanging. Human rights organisations and Rwandan activists challenged this.
 Unity Mitford, (1948), British socialite and Nazi sympathiser, died eight years after shooting herself of injuries caused by the bullet; debatable if this counts as suicide
 Alighiero Noschese (1979), Italian TV impersonator, gunshot while being recovered under care for clinical depression. As patients with depression are not permitted to possess firearms and other lethal objects, it was suspected that someone murdered Noschese or smuggled the gun to him.
 Orgetorix (60 BC), Gallic member of the ruling class of the Helvetii and conspirator. It is uncertain if he died by suicide or was executed.
 Giuseppe Pinelli (1969), Italian anarchist, fall from police station window, police claim of suicide widely disputed
 John William Polidori (1821), English writer and physician, ingestion of hydrogen cyanide. The coroner gave a verdict of death by natural causes despite strong evidence of suicide
 Freddie Prinze (1977), American actor and comedian, gunshot to the head while under the influence of methaqualone and alcohol. His death was initially ruled suicide, but his mother and other loved ones successfully convinced a court to change the official cause of death to accidental.
 Elliott Smith (2003), American singer, songwriter and musician, stab wounds to chest. While Smith's death was originally reported as a suicide, the official autopsy report released in December 2003 left open the question of homicide
 Socrates (399 BC), Classical Greek Athenian philosopher, credited as one of the founders of Western philosophy, poison (likely hemlock) Due to the fact that Socrates was forced to poison himself to death as his sentence following his conviction for impiety and corrupting the minds of the youth of Athens, the question of whether this constitutes a genuine suicide is a subject of debate.
 John Hanning Speke (1864), British explorer, gunshot. An inquest concluded that his death was accidental, a conclusion supported by Speke's biographer Alexander Maitland, as the location of the fatal wound just below Speke's armpit made suicide unlikely. However, the idea of suicide has appealed to some critics of Speke.
 Tsarong (1959), Tibetan diplomat, court official and reformer, died in a Chinese prison shortly before his public execution with no cause of death ever being revealed, his friend Heinrich Harrer suspects suicide
 Sid Vicious (1979), English musician and member of the Sex Pistols, heroin overdose He had made a suicide pact with his then recently deceased girlfriend, Nancy Spungen, as evident by a note found in his coat pocket after his death. 
 Lolo Ferrari (2000), French pornographic actress, dancer, singer, and Guinness World Record holder, antidepressant and heroin overdose. Ferrari had been depressed, and while her death was ruled a suicide, it is speculated that her husband killed her. After it was found that mechanically induced suffocation could not be ruled out, her husband was arrested. He was released from prison after 13 months, after a second autopsy was performed.

References

External links

 
 

Suicides
Ancient people who committed suicide
suicide